Wiley Anderson Davis  (August 1, 1875 – September 22, 1942), is a former Major League Baseball pitcher. He played in two games for the Cincinnati Reds of the National League on April 18 & 21, 1896. He played in the Southeastern League in 1897 and the Western League in 1898.

External links

1875 births
1942 deaths
Major League Baseball pitchers
Baseball players from Tennessee
19th-century baseball players
Cincinnati Reds players
Indianapolis Hoosiers (minor league) players
Knoxville Indians players
Columbus Buckeyes (minor league) players
Columbus Senators players
People from Sevier County, Tennessee